The Province of Maryland was a proprietary colony, in the hands of the Calvert family, who held it from 1633 to 1689, and again from 1715 to 1776. George Calvert, 1st Baron Baltimore (1580–1632) is often regarded as the founder of Maryland, but he died before the colony could be organized. Thus the colonial administration began with his son:
Cecil Calvert, 2nd Baron Baltimore, 1633–1675
much of the colony was under republican control from 1650 to 1658.
Charles Calvert, 3rd Baron Baltimore, 1675–1689
deprived of his proprietorship for his support of James II. Died 1715
Charles Calvert, 5th Baron Baltimore, 1715–1751
Frederick Calvert, 6th Baron Baltimore, 1751–1771
Henry Harford, illegitimate son of the 6th Lord Baltimore, 1771–1776

See also
Baron Baltimore
Loyalist (American Revolution)

External links
 Calvert Family Tree Retrieved Jul 10 2013
 Calverts at http://thepeerage.com Retrieved Jan 24 2010

Province of Maryland
Proprietors of Maryland
Calvert family
Maryland